Kim Sơn is a rural district of Ninh Bình province in the Red River Delta region of Vietnam. As of 2003 the district had a population of 171,660. The district covers an area of 165 km². The district capital lies at Phát Diệm.

Gallery

References

Districts of Ninh Bình province